Basistichus micans is a species of beetle in the family Carabidae, the only species in the genus Basistichus.

References

Lebiinae